The California Privacy Rights Act of 2020 (CPRA), also known as Proposition 24, is a California ballot proposition that was approved by a majority of voters after appearing on the ballot for the general election on November 3, 2020. This proposition expands California's consumer privacy law and builds upon the California Consumer Privacy Act (CCPA) of 2018, which established a foundation for consumer privacy regulations.

The proposition enshrines more provisions in California state law, allowing consumers to prevent businesses from sharing their personal data, correct inaccurate personal data, and limit businesses' usage of "sensitive personal information", which includes precise geolocation, race, ethnicity, religion, genetic data, private communications, sexual orientation, and specified health information. The Act creates the California Privacy Protection Agency as a dedicated agency to implement and enforce state privacy laws, investigate violations, and assess penalties of violators. The Act also removes the set time period in which businesses can correct violations without penalty, prohibits businesses from holding onto personal data for longer than necessary, triples the maximum fines for violations involving children under the age of 16 (up to $7,500), and authorizes civil penalties for the theft of specified login information.

The California Privacy Rights Act took effect on January 1, 2023, applying to personal data collected on or after January 1, 2022. The law cannot be repealed by the state legislature, and any amendments made by the legislature must be “consistent with and further the purpose and intent” of the Act.

Background 
The initiative represents an expansion of provisions first laid out by the California Consumer Privacy Act. In addition to the consumer protections, the proposition creates the California Privacy Protection Agency. The agency will share consumer privacy oversight and enforcement duties with the California Department of Justice. Another effect of the initiative is requiring businesses to obtain permission from consumers younger than 16 before collecting their data and permission from a parent or guardian before collecting data from consumers younger than 13.

Intentions of the Act 
The intentions of the Act are to provide California residents with the right to:

 Know who is collecting their and their children's personal information, how it is being used, and to whom it is disclosed.
 Control the use of their personal information, including limiting the use of their sensitive personal information.
 Have access to their personal information and the ability to correct, delete, and transfer their personal information.
 Exercise their privacy rights through easily accessible self-serve tools.
 Exercise their privacy rights without being penalized.
 Hold businesses accountable for failing to take reasonable information security precautions.
 Benefit from businesses' use of their personal information.
 Have their privacy interests protected even as employees and independent contractors.

Polls

Results 
The proposition passed with roughly 55% of California voters voting in favor of the measure.

Notes 

Partisan clients

References 

2020 in American law
2020 California ballot propositions
California statutes
Privacy law
Data protection
Information privacy
Data laws of the Americas
Internet privacy legislation
United States state privacy legislation